Monika Krasteva (Bulgarian Cyrillic: Моника Кръстева; born 9 May 1999 in Kyustendil) is an international volleyball player from Bulgaria. She currently plays for Bulgaria and Levski Volley as opposite.Сестра Александра Кръстева.

References 

1999 births
Living people
Bulgarian women's volleyball players
Sportspeople from Kyustendil Province
European Games competitors for Bulgaria
Opposite hitters